Director of Security of the Defense Establishment or just Ministry of Defense Security Authority, Malmab (Ha-Memune al ha-bitahon be-Ma'arechet Ha-Bitahon) is a department in the Israeli Defense Ministry that responsible for the security of the Defense Ministry, Israeli weapons industries and institutions in dealing with development and production of weapons of mass destruction and defensive centers such, the Negev Nuclear Research Center, Israel Institute for Biological Research and military units engaged in these areas.

The Malmab was established in 1958, under the leadership of Haim Kermun, former Shin Bet officer.

Tha Malmab investigates the function of the workers, security audits, certification of the exposure technology, corruption and preventing leakage of classified information.

The Malmab also operates as an Intelligence Agency—as the Malmab runs agents who are responsible for dealing with obtaining technological information and intelligence in foreign countries. This area was the responsibility of Science Affairs Bureau, but in 1986, after the Pollard affair, the Lekem powers were transferred.

In 2007, Amir Kane was appointed as the Director of Security of the Defense Establishment, instead of Yehiel Horev who was in this position for 21 years.

Heads of Malmab
Haim Kermun (1958–1986)
Yehiel Horev (1986–2007)
Amir Kane (2007-2015)
Nir Ben Moshe (2015-2021)
Gil Ben Ami (Acting)

See also
National Administration for the Protection of State Secrets

Notes

External links
The MALMAB in armageddon.org.il (Hebrew)

Israeli intelligence agencies
Ministry of Defense (Israel)
Information sensitivity